is a player character in Square's (now Square Enix) 1997 role-playing video game Final Fantasy VII. Designed by Tetsuya Nomura, Vincent also appears in various titles from the Compilation of Final Fantasy VII, a metaseries set in the Final Fantasy VII continuity. Specifically, he is the protagonist in the 2006 third-person shooter Dirge of Cerberus: Final Fantasy VII and its mobile phone tie-in Dirge of Cerberus: Lost Episode. Vincent is voiced in Japanese by Shōgo Suzuki and in English by Steven Blum.

In the backstory to Final Fantasy VII, Vincent is a Turk who is assigned to guard the scientist Lucrecia Crescent, with whom he falls in love. After a series of scientific experiments involving the cells of the extraterrestrial lifeform Jenova, Crescent gives birth to the game's antagonist, Sephiroth, (Hojo being the father). Soon thereafter, Vincent himself became a test subject to experiments performed by Hojo after he had shot Vincent, resulting in genetic modification. The modification supplanted other forms within Vincent as well as superior strength, speed, and healing. Vincent also will not age. If the player unlocks Vincent, he will join Cloud Strife's group to stop Sephiroth, as well as to seek revenge on Hojo.

Due to time constraints, Vincent was originally not intended to be playable in Final Fantasy VII, but was ultimately made an optional character. Despite his optional status and lack of concrete detail as to his background, he proved very popular with both fans and critics, and his history was developed greatly in other installments of the Compilation, primarily Final Fantasy VII: Advent Children and Dirge of Cerberus.

Appearances

Final Fantasy VII
Players can unlock Vincent by the halfway point of Final Fantasy VII, when Cloud Strife and his allies find him sleeping in a coffin in the basement of Shinra Mansion in Nibelheim. Cloud mentions his quest to stop the game's antagonist, Sephiroth, who Vincent recognizes as the son of Lucrecia Crescent. Vincent joins the group when he learns that they may eventually meet up with Hojo, against whom Vincent has an unexplained vendetta. Later, Vincent finds Lucrecia inside a cave, and his backstory is partly revealed. Vincent was a member of the Turks, an elite group of Shinra agents. While serving as Lucrecia's bodyguard, he then fell in love with her, but she ultimately decided to remain faithful to Hojo, who persuaded her to use her unborn baby in his experiments. When protesting about the nature of these experiments, Vincent was shot by Hojo, who subsequently began to experiment on him as well. This resulted in him not aging and having the ability to transform into various Monsters. Not being able to protect Lucrecia, Vincent felt strong guilt which led him to his separation. Overcome by guilt, Lucrecia sealed herself away in a Mako crystal. Upon entering the cave in the game, Lucrecia revives and asks Vincent if Sephiroth is still alive, but Vincent lies and tells her that he is dead.

Compilation of Final Fantasy VII
In Before Crisis: Final Fantasy VII, which is set six years prior to Final Fantasy VII, Vincent is seen in his Turk attire having a conversation with Veld, leader of the Turks. He subsequently helps Veld obtain some Materia needed for a mission. In the film Final Fantasy VII: Advent Children, set two years after Final Fantasy VII, Vincent rescues Cloud from Kadaj and his gang. He reveals to Cloud Kadaj's intentions to merge with the remaining Jenova cells so as to bring about Sephiroth's rebirth. Vincent later helps Cloud and his Final Fantasy VII allies defeat the summon creature Bahamut SIN. In the  On the Way to a Smile novella "Case of Nanaki", set between the original game and Advent Children, Vincent encounters his former comrade, Red XIII (Nanaki), who is fearful that he will soon be alone due to his lifespan being much longer than humans. Vincent explains to Red that he is immortal and promises to meet with him every year to prevent his loneliness.

In Dirge of Cerberus: Final Fantasy VII, which takes place one year after Advent Children, Vincent is seen working with Reeve Tuesti and the World Regenesis Organization to eliminate an organization called Deepground, who have targeted Vincent because he carries  inside his body, implanted by Lucrecia after he was shot by Hojo. The purpose of the Protomateria was to enable Vincent to control the  gene, with which he was injected by Lucrecia to save his life. The Protomateria is eventually ripped from his body by Rosso the Crimson, leading to Vincent being unable to control Chaos. Eventually, he confronts the Deepground leader, Weiss the Immaculate, who is possessed by the digitalized mind of Hojo. Hojo reveals that his plan is to awaken Omega WEAPON, who will absorb the Lifestream and leave the Planet, resulting in the death of all living things. After Omega's awakening, the renegade Deepground member, Shelke, returns the Protomateria to Vincent, and he is once again able to control Chaos, ultimately destroying both Hojo and Omega. The mobile game Dirge of Cerberus Lost Episode: Final Fantasy VII takes place during Dirge of Cerberus and also features Vincent as the protagonist.

Other appearances
Outside the Final Fantasy VII series, Vincent appears in the fighting game Ehrgeiz as an unlockable character, with his Turk uniform as an alternate costume. Like the other Final Fantasy VII characters in the game, Vincent does not serve a role in the main storyline. Although he was meant to appear in Kingdom Hearts, his design was instead used as the basis for Cloud's redesign. Vincent's popularity has seen merchandise related to the character, including the release of action figures. Vincent also appears in Super Smash Bros. Ultimate as a spirit.

Character design
Character designer Tetsuya Nomura has explained that Vincent's character shifted from that of horror researcher, to detective, to chemist, and finally to the figure of a former Turk with a tragic past. Director Yoshinori Kitase was in charge of the cutscene in which Vincent joins the party, while scenario writer Kazushige Nojima wrote his backstory. Nojima had a great deal of trouble with Vincent's dialogue, as he very rarely speaks. In the original script of the game, Vincent was introduced in a similar fashion but was a handsome, sarcastic personality. He would join Cloud's group after learning they were in pursuit of Hojo, but he had no knowledge of the results of the experimentation to which he was subjected. Additionally, he would be also privy to more information regarding Shinra's involvement with the creation of Sephiroth, and it is he who would explain to Cloud the story of Sephiroth's origins. When the game was still in development, Nomura and his staff considering removing Vincent and Yuffie Kisaragi altogether, as they did not have enough time to work them into the story properly. As a result, Vincent and Yuffie ultimately appeared as optional characters in the game.

Vincent's Japanese voice actor, Shōgo Suzuki, explained that he tries "to hold back as much emotion as possible when playing Vincent", noting that Vincent is "a bit of a loner" and "appears cold on the surface". Nomura wanted Cloud and Vincent's voices to contrast with each other due to their similarities in terms of personality. He felt Vincent was older and more mature than Cloud, and as a result, he cast Suzuki, who has a very low voice. In the English dub, Vincent was voiced by Steve Blum as the casting staff searched for a man who portrays Vincent's brooding manner based on his dark past. Blum was overjoyed because he claims being a fan of the original Final Fantasy VII.

Vincent is shown to be a tall, lean man with long black hair and a ragged red cloak and mantle over black underclothes. He wears a metallic, golden-colored gauntlet on his left forearm. Vincent's cloak covers the lower half of his face and is held closed by a series of buckles. His eyes are naturally red. His crimson cloak was added to symbolize the idea of Vincent carrying a heavyweight connected to death. While other characters were given simple costumes in Advent Children, Vincent was given something more complex. Nomura felt that changing his design to something complicated would "conflict with his personality", which is relatively straightforward, and he was thus given attire consisting of "various, complex parts". His cloak was difficult to animate due to it being very organic; the overall complexity of Vincent's design led to his scenes being "especially hard to create". These scenes were constantly being adjusted so as "to convey [their] elusive nature of seemingly having shape, but not". These adjustments concluded six months before the film's completion.

Vincent was chosen as the protagonist of Dirge of Cerberus due to his strong connections to the setting of Final Fantasy VII and the room available for expanding on his background. Due to the staff's desire to make Dirge a shooter, Vincent was also chosen because of his weaponry, while his transformations into a different type of monsters in the original Final Fantasy VII was something the staff wanted to work into the gameplay. For the game, Nomura redesigned Vincent's gun in the same way that Cloud's Buster Sword was redesigned for Advent Children, so as to demonstrate that Vincent is the protagonist of the game. The gun was named  in reference to the multiheaded hound with the same name from Greek and Roman mythology; the gun has three barrels as Cerberus has three heads.

Reception

The character has received mixed comments by video games publications. In GameSpot's article "The History of Final Fantasy", Vincent was comically referred to as the Final Fantasy VII character who female players found to be "the most alluring undead man they've ever met". In IGN's 2008 list top ten Final Fantasy VII characters, Vincent was given an honorable mention by Dave Smith. He received praise for his "striking" character design, as well as the fact that "FFVII'''s 3D engine made his shape-shifting Limit Breaks some surprisingly scary stuff". He has been held as an example of the recurring character categories of "The Kickass Quiet Guy" by 1UP.com and "The Brooding Pretty Boy" by GamesRadar. In 2013, Vincent was included among the ten most notable vampire characters in video games by Gergo Vas of Kotaku. That same year, Gus Turner Complex ranked Vincent as the 13th greatest Final Fantasy character of all time. The results of IGN'S, "Final Fantasy Face Off: Who Is The Best Party Member?" popularity poll in July 2021, ranked Vincent in 9th place among 108 Final Fantasy party members across the entire main numbered series.

There was also commentary about Vincent's appearances in his own spin-off. GameSpot writer Greg Mueller regarded Vincent as one of "the more interesting characters from Final Fantasy VII" and liked how Dirge of Cerberus was focused on him and explained his origins more clearly. His character design and abilities have been praised by GameSpy's Justin Speer, who felt that with such traits he "capably steps into a leading role" of Dirge of Cerberus. IGN's Jeremy Dunham had a similar opinion, noting that Vincent "is exposed pretty convincingly here". Eurogamer's Rob Fahey criticized Vincent for not being familiar enough to players, even to those who played the original Final Fantasy VII, to warrant his role as protagonist in Dirge of Cerberus. However, Fahey still recognized him as a very popular character, commenting that he is one of the most common characters from Final Fantasy VII to be featured in fan fiction and fan art. Although RPGamer's Michael "CactuarJoe" Beckett said that Vincent was one of the "less well-developed" characters from Final Fantasy VII, he found his development in Dirge of Cerberus to be satisfying. According to GamesRadar, Dirge of Cerberus focused on developing Vincent due to his lack of backstory in Final Fantasy VII, and regarded the mobile phone spin-off as "Vincent fan service instead of FFVII canon". 

GamesRadar claimed that they look forward to the character's debut in the remake installments of Final Fantasy VII'' as the first volume still did not focus on him. Steve Blum's performance as Vincent achieved a positive response from fans and the media.

See also
 List of Final Fantasy VII characters

References

External links 

Characters designed by Tetsuya Nomura
Fictional gunfighters in video games
Fictional marksmen and snipers
Fictional secret agents and spies in video games
Final Fantasy VII characters
Genetically engineered characters in video games
Male characters in video games
Science fantasy video game characters
Shapeshifter characters in video games
Square Enix protagonists
Video game characters introduced in 1997
Video game characters who can move at superhuman speeds
Video game characters with accelerated healing
Video game characters with slowed ageing